Nilla Pizzi, stage name of Adionilla Pizzi (16 April 1919 – 12 March 2011), was an Italian singer and actress.

Born in Sant'Agata Bolognese, she was particularly famous in Italy during the 1950s and 1960s. She won the first edition of the San Remo Festival in 1951, singing "Grazie dei fiori", and the second edition (1952), with "Vola colomba". Her hits include "Papaveri e papere", the original version of "Poppa Piccolino".

References

1919 births
2011 deaths
People from the Province of Bologna
RCA Victor artists
Sanremo Music Festival winners
20th-century Italian women singers